The 2009 Korean Series was the 27th edition of Korea Baseball Organization's championship series. The best-of-seven playoff is played between the KIA Tigers (1st) and the SK Wyverns (2nd). The KIA Tigers won the series in seven games.

Game summaries

Game 1
Friday, October 16, 2009 at Moodeung Stadium in Gwangju

Game 2
Saturday, October 17, 2009 at Moodeung Stadium in Gwangju

Game 3
Monday, October 19, 2009 at Munhak Baseball Stadium in Incheon

Game 4
Tuesday, October 20, 2009 at Munhak Baseball Stadium in Incheon

Game 5
Thursday, October 22, 2009 at Jamsil Baseball Stadium in Seoul

Game 6
Friday, October 23, 2009 at Jamsil Baseball Stadium in Seoul

Game 7
Saturday, October 24, 2009 at Jamsil Baseball Stadium in Seoul

References

Korean Series
Korean Series
Korean Series
Kia Tigers
SSG Landers